Argyrotaenia amatana, the pondapple leafroller moth, is a species of moth of the family Tortricidae. It is found in North America, where it has been recorded from Florida and The Bahamas.

The wingspan is 13–16 mm. Adults have been recorded nearly year round.

The larvae feed on a wide range of plants, including Acer rubrum, Eupatorium incarnatum, Laguncularia racemosa, Lysimola bahamensis, Persea borbonica, Persea americana, Sagittaria falcata, Salix caroliniana, Taxodium distichum, Annona glabra, Eugenia species and Nectandra coriacea.

References

amatana
Moths of North America
Moths described in 1901